Lake Nazik is a freshwater lake in the Bitlis Province, eastern part of Turkey. Lake Nazik is located in the elevation of about 1,816 m. It has an area of 44.5 km² and maximum depth of about 50 m.

References 
 Sports Activities at the Republic of Turkey Ministry of Culture and Tourism Site

Nazik
Landforms of Bitlis Province